Kedrick is a given name. Notable people with the name include:

Kedrick Brown (born 1981), American basketball player
Kedrick Pickering (born 1958), British Virgin Islands politician

See also
Kendrick (name)

Masculine given names